Chandpai Union is an Union parishad of Mongla Upazila, Bagerhat District in Khulna Division of Bangladesh. It has an area of 53.22 km2 (20.55 sq mi) and a population of 17,662.

References

Unions of Mongla Upazila
Unions of Bagerhat District
Unions of Khulna Division